Zbigniew Hubert Cybulski (3 November 1927 – 8 January 1967) was a Polish actor, one of the best-known and most popular personalities of the post-World War II history of Poland.

Life
Zbigniew Cybulski was born 3 November 1927 in a small village of Kniaże near Śniatyń, Poland (now a part of Kolomyia Raion, Ivano-Frankivsk Oblast, Ukraine). After World War II he joined the Theatre Academy in Kraków. He graduated in 1953 and moved to Gdańsk, where he made his stage debut in Leon Schiller's Wybrzeże Theatre. Also, with his friend Bogumił Kobiela, Cybulski founded a famous student theatre, the Bim-Bom. In the early 1960s, Cybulski moved to Warsaw, where he shortly joined the Kabaret Wagabunda. He also appeared on stage at the Ateneum Theatre, one of the most modern and least conservative Warsaw-based theatres of the epoch.

However, Cybulski is best remembered as a screen actor. He first appeared in a 1954 film Kariera as an extra. His first major role came in 1958, when he played in Kazimierz Kutz's Krzyż Walecznych. The same year he also appeared as one of the main characters in Andrzej Wajda's Ashes and Diamonds and Aleksander Ford's The Eighth Day of the Week based on a short story by Marek Hłasko. From then on Cybulski was seen as one of the most notable actors of the Polish Film School and one of the "young and wrathful", as his generation of actors were called at the time.

His most famous films, apart from Ashes and Diamonds, include Wojciech Has' The Saragossa Manuscript. He also acted in numerous television plays, including some based on works by Truman Capote, Anton Chekhov and Jerzy Andrzejewski.

Cybulski died in an accident at a Wrocław Główny railway station on 8 January 1967, on his way from the film set. As he jumped on the  speeding train (as he often did), he slipped on the steps, fell under the train, and was run over. He was buried in Katowice.

Legacy

Cybulski remains a legend of the Polish cinema. His style of acting was revolutionary at the time, as was his image (leather clothes and big sunglasses). He was often referred to as "the Polish James Dean". Like Dean, he played nonconformist rebels, and like him he died young.

The Polish band 2 Plus 1 recorded a tribute album to Cybulski, called Aktor in 1977.

In 1996, readers of Film magazine awarded him the title of Best Polish Actor of All Time.

In 1969 the Zbigniew Cybulski Award (Polish: Nagroda im. Zbyszka Cybulskiego) for young film actors with strong individuality was introduced.

Partial filmography

1955: A Generation – Kostek
1955: Kariera – Bus Passenger (uncredited)
1955: Trzy starty – Mietek Leśniak
1956: Tajemnica dzikiego szybu – Miner (uncredited)
1957: Wraki – Rafał Grabień
1957: Koniec nocy – Romek Brzozowski
1958: The Eighth Day of the Week – Piotr Terlecki
1958: Ashes and Diamonds – Maciek Chełmicki
1958: Krzyż Walecznych – Zootechnik Tadeusz Wiecek
1959: Night Train – Staszek
1960: Do widzenia, do jutra – Jacek
1960: Innocent Sorcerers – Edmund
1960: Rozstanie – renowned actor
1962: Love at Twenty – Zbyszek (segment "Warszawa")
1962: La Poupée – Colonel Octavio Prado Roth / Cotal, le rebelle
1962: How to Be Loved – Wiktor Rawicz
1963: Ich dzień powszedni (Their Everyday Life) – doktor Andrzej Siennicki
1963: Zbrodniarz i panna – Capt. Jan Zietek
1963: Milczenie – Roman
1963: Rozwodów nie będzie – Gruszka (episode 3)
1964: To Love – Fredrik
1964: Giuseppe w Warszawie – Staszek, Maria's Brother
1964: The Saragossa Manuscript – Alfons Van Worden
1965: Pingwin – Łukasz
1965: Salto – Kowalski / Malinowski
1965: Sam pośród miasta – Konrad Ferenc
1966: Jutro Meksyk – Paweł Janczak
1966: Przedświąteczny wieczór – Zapala's friend
1966: Mistrz (TV Movie) – Director of 'Macbeth'
1966: Szyfry – Maciek
1966: Iluzja (TV Short) – Lover
1967: Cała naprzód – Janek
1967: Morderca zostawia ślad – Rodecki
1967: Jowita – Edward Księżak (final film role)

See also
List of Poles

References

External links
 

1927 births
1967 deaths
People from Ivano-Frankivsk Oblast
Polish male film actors
Polish male stage actors
Polish cabaret performers
Railway accident deaths in Poland
20th-century Polish male actors
20th-century comedians